This list contains people who contributed to the field of lexicography, the theory and practice of compiling dictionaries.

 

A
Maulvi Abdul Haq (India/Pakistan, 1872–1961) Baba-e-Urdu, English-Urdu dictionary
Ivar Aasen (Norway, 1813–1896) Norwegian language
Abu Amr Ishaq ibn Mirar al-Shaybani (Iraq, c. 738–828) Arabic
Ilia Abuladze (Georgia, 1901–1968) Old Georgian
Johann Christoph Adelung (Germany, 1732–1806) German language general dictionary
George J. Adler (Germany/US, 1821–1868) German/English
Robert Ainsworth (UK, 1660–1743) Latin
Adam Jack Aitken (UK, 1921–1998) Scots language
John Michael Allaby (UK, born 1933) English LSP
Anthony Allen (UK, late 17th century – 1754) obsolete English words
Robert Allen (UK, born 1944) English language general
Amerias (Greece, 3rd century BC) Ancient Macedonian
Ethan Allen Andrews (US, 1787–1858) Latin
Vladimir Anić (Croatia, 1930–2000) Croatian general
Vaman Shivram Apte (India, 1858–1892) English-Sanskrit
Ġużè Aquilina (Malta, 1911–1997) Maltese language
Aristophanes of Byzantium (Greece, 257–180 BC) Ancient Greek
Sue Atkins (UK, 1931–2021) English/French bilingual
Ali Azaykou (Morocco, 1942–2004) Berber languages

B
Albert Bachmann (Switzerland, 1863–1934) Swiss German
Francis Bacon (UK, 1561–1626) philosophy and science
Nathan Bailey (UK, 1691–1742) English
Johannes Balbus (Italy, died 1298) Latin
Frederick W. Baller (UK, 1852–1922) Chinese
Katherine Barber (Canada, 1959–2021) English
Edmund Henry Barker (UK, 1788–1839) Classical languages
Clarence Barnhart (US, 1900–1993) English general dictionary
David Barnhart (US, born 1941) English
Robert Barnhart (US, 1933–2007) English
Louis Barral (France, 1910–1999) French and Monégasque
Grant Barrett (US, born 1970) English dictionary of slang
John Barrow (UK, fl. 1735–1774) navigation and science
Marcos E. Becerra (Mexico, 1870–1940) Spanish language
Richard Beckett (Australia, 1936–1987) English food guides
William Bedwell (UK, 1561–1632) Arabic
Ivan Belostenec (Croatia, 1594–1675) Illyrian and Latin
Henning Bergenholtz (Denmark, born 1944) Danish LSP dictionary
Eric Blom (Switzerland, 1888–1959) music dictionary
Thomas Blount (UK, 1618–1679) English
Robert Blust (US, 1940–2022) Austronesian languages
Jean-Baptiste Boissiere (France, 1806–1885) French thesaurus
Peter Bowler (Australia, living) English
Abel Boyer (France, c. 1667–1729) French and English
Dan Beach Bradley (US, 1845–1923) Siamese
Henry Bradley (UK, 1845–1923) English general
Jim Breen (Australia, born 1947) Japanese and English
Ebenezer Cobham Brewer (UK, 1810–1897) English
Francis Brinkley (Ireland/UK/Japan, 1841–1912) Japanese and English
Nathan Brown (US/Burma/Japan, 1807–1886) Assamese and Japanese
Aleksander Brückner (Poland, 1856–1939) Polish and German
Kazimieras Būga (Lithuania, 1879–1924) Lithuanian
John Bullokar (UK, 1574–1627) English language dictionary of hard words
Robert Burchfield (New Zealand/UK 1923–2004) English language historical
Arthur Coke Burnell (England and India, 1840–1882), co-compiler of Hobson-Jobson Anglo-Indian

C
Ambrogio Calepino (Italy, c. 1450–1510) Latin
Angus Cameron (Canada, 1941–1983) English
Joachim Heinrich Campe (Germany, 1746–1818) German
Emanuel Nunes Carvalho (UK/US, 1771–1817) Hebrew
Edmund Castell (UK, 1606–1685) Oriental languages
Robert Cawdrey (UK, c. 1538–1604) English
Pranas Čepėnas (Lithuania/US, 1899–1980) Lithuanian
Mohamed Chafik (Morocco, born 1926) Berber
Robert L. Chapman (US, 1920–2002) English
Nikoloz Cholokashvili (Georgia, 1585–1658) Georgian
David Chubinashvili (Georgia/Russia, 1814–1891) Georgian
Michael Chyet (US, born 1957) Kurdish
Saïd Cid Kaoui (Algeria, 1859–1910) Berber
Cigerxwîn (Turkey/Syria, 1903–1984) Kurdish language
Henry Cockeram (UK, 17th century) English and Latin
Herbert Coleridge (UK, 1830–1861) English language historical
Elisha Coles (UK, c. 1608–1688) English
Thomas Cooper (UK, c. 1517–1594) English and Latin
Randle Cotgrave (UK, died 1634) English and French
John Craig (UK, 1796–1880), English
William Craigie (UK/US, 1867–1957) English language historical dictionary
Jane Tapsubei Creider (Kenya) Nandi language

D
Vladimir Dahl (Russia, 1801–1872) Explanatory Dictionary of the Live Great Russian language
Charles Anderson Dana (US, 1819–1897) English language encyclopedic dictionary
Frederick William Danker (US, 1920–2012) New Testament Greek lexicon
Đào Duy Anh (Vietnam, 1904–1988) Scholarly Vietnamese, Pháp-Việt Từ điển 
Khudiram Das (India, 1916–2002) Bengali-Santali
John Davies (Wales, 1567–1644) Welsh and Latin
Tomás de Bhaldraithe (Ireland, 1916–1996) Irish and English
William Quinby De Funiak (US, 1901–1981) American and British
Ali-Akbar Dehkhoda (Iran, 1879–1956) Extensive dictionary in Persian
Philip Delaporte (Germany/US, 1868–1928) German and Nauruan
Francesco della Penna (Italy, 1680–1745) Tibetan and Italian bilingual
Susie Dent (UK, born 1964) English
Friedrich Christian Diez (Germany, 1794–1876) Etymological dictionary of Romance languages
Patrick S. Dinneen (Ireland, 1860–1934) Irish and English bilingual
Josef Dobrovský (Czechoslovakia, 1753–1829) Slavic languages, Czech and German bilingual
Jacob Ludwig Döhne (Germany/South Africa, 1811–1879) Zulu and English bilingual
Franz Dornseiff (Germany, 1888–1960) German language thesaurus
Henry Drisler (US, 1818–1939) Latin dictionary
Konrad Duden (Germany, 1829–1911) German language general
Edward Dwelly (UK, 1864–1939) Scottish Gaelic
Thomas Dyche (UK, late 17th century – 1733) English language spelling

E
Eugene Ehrlich (US, 1922–2008) English language general and specialised
Ernst Johann Eitel (Germany/China, 1838–1908) Cantonese Chinese dictionary
John Eliot (UK/US, 1604–1690) Native American
Karim Emami (Iran, 1930–2005) Persian and English
Leo James English (Australia/Philippines, 1907–1997) Tagalog and English bilingual
Adolf Erman (Germany, 1854–1937) Ancient Egyptian
Robert Estienne (France, 1503–1559) Latin thesaurus
Daniel Silvan Evans (Wales, 1818–1903) Welsh and English bilingual
Avraham Even-Shoshan (Belarus/Israel, 1906–1984) Hebrew language general

F
Fairuzabadi (Iran, 1329–1414) Arabic language comprehensive
Al-Khalil ibn Ahmad al-Farahidi (Basra, 718–791) Arabic language general
Fortunato Felice (Italy, 1723–1789) Italian and French encyclopedic
Christiane Fellbaum (Germany/US, living) German and English cognitive linguistics
Jean-François Féraud (France, 1725–1807) French critical dictionary
Charles J. Fillmore (US, 1929–2014) English and Japanese cognitive linguistics
Stuart Berg Flexner (US, 1928–1990) English dictionary of slang
John Florio (England, 1553–1625) comprehensive Italian to English
Henrik Florinus (Finland, 1633–1705) Latin, Swedish and Finnish trilingual
Johann Gottfried Flügel (Germany/US, 1788–1855) German and English bilingual
Henry Watson Fowler (UK, 1858–1933) English general
Sami Frashëri (also Şemseddin Sâmi) (Ottoman Empire, 1850–1904) Ottoman Turkish, Arabic, French
James O. Fraser (UK/China, 1886–1938) Lisu language
Wilhelm Freund (Germany, 1806–1894) Latin general
Jens Andreas Friis (Norway, 1821–1896) Sami language general 
Johan Fritzner (Norway, 1812–1893) Old Norse
Louis Frolla (Monaco, 1904–1978) French and Monégasque
Isaac Kaufmann Funk (US, 1839–1912) English general
Antoine Furetière (France, 1619–1688) French universal
Frederick James Furnivall (UK, 1825–1910) English historical

G
Brent Galloway (US, 1944–2014) Native American languages
Cristfried Ganander (Finland, 1741–1790) Finnish general
Marie de Garis (UK, 1910–2010) Guernésiais language general dictionary
Johannes de Garlandia (UK/France, c. 1190–1270) Latin
Bryan A. Garner (US, born 1958) English general and LSP 
Dirk Geeraerts (Belgium, born 1955) cognitive linguistics
Nayden Gerov (Bulgaria, 1823–1900) Bulgarian general
Konstantinos G. Giagkoullis (Cyprus, born 1943) Cypriot Greek etymology
Peter Gilliver (UK, born 1964) English historical
Rudolph Goclenius (Germany, 1547–1628) Latin LSP
Jacob Golius (Netherlands, 1596–1667) Arabic and Persian to Latin
Chauncey Allen Goodrich (US, 1790–1860) English general
Philip Babcock Gove (US, 1902–1972) English general
Louis Herbert Gray (US, 1875–1955) Indo-Iranian languages
Jonathon Green (UK, born 1948) English slang
Jacob Ludwig Carl Grimm (Germany, 1785–1863) German historical 
Francis Hindes Groome (UK, 1851–1902) Gypsy
Francis Grose (UK, c. 1730–1791) English historical
Hermann Gundert (Germany/India, 1814–1893) Malayalam and English bilingual
Rosario María Gutiérrez Eskildsen (Mexico, 1899–1979) Spanish language
Karl Gützlaff (Germany/Thailand/China, 1803–1851) Cambodian and Chinese
Bartol Gyurgieuvits (Croatia, 1506–1566) Croatian and Latin bilingual

H
Mary Rosamund Haas (US, 1910–1996) Native American and Thai
Soleiman Haim (Iran, 1897–1970) Persian and English bilingual
Patrick Hanks (UK, born 1940) English language general, onomastic, and LSP
Johann Ernst Hanxleden (Germany/India, 1681–1732) Malayalam, Sanskrit and Portuguese dictionary
Orin Hargraves (US, born 1953) English dictionary of slang and rhyme
Alexander Harkavy (Belarus/US, 1863–1939) Yiddish and English bilingual
William Torrey Harris (US, 1835–1909) philosophy, English general
Reinhard Hartmann (Austria/UK, born 1938) Austrian and English contrastive linguistics, LSP dictionary
Hamid Hassani (Iran, born 1968) Persian corpus linguistics, Persian dictionary
Einar Ingvald Haugen (Norway/US, 1906–1994) Old Norse, Norwegian and English
Joyce Hawkins (England, 1928–1992) English language general
S.I. Hayakawa (Canada/US, 1906–1992), biographical directory of US Congress
Benjamin Hedericus (Germany, 1675–1748) Latin and Greek
Tom Heehler (US, born 1963) The Well-Spoken Thesaurus
Michael Heilprin (Poland/US, 1823–1888) Hebrew and English encyclopedic
James Curtis Hepburn (US/China/Japan, 1815–1911) Japanese and English bilingual
Charles George Herbermann (Germany/US, 1840–1916) English language LSP
Hesychius of Alexandria (Greece, 5th century) Ancient Greek language lexicon
Johann Christian August Heyse (Germany, 1764–1829) German dictionary of loan words
Jack Hibberd (Australia, born 1940) English dictionary of slang
Hoke Sein (Myanmar, 1890–1984) Universal Burmese-English-Pali
Aurélio Buarque de Holanda Ferreira (Brazil, 1910–1989) Portuguese-language general
William Holwell (1726–1798), English classicist and cleric
Francis Holyoake (UK, 1567–1653) English etymological
A. S. Hornby (UK/Japan, 1898–1978) English learners'
John Camden Hotten (UK, 1832–1873) English slang, A Dictionary of Modern Slang, Cant, and Vulgar Words
Antônio Houaiss (Brazil, 1915–1999) Portuguese general 
Richard Howard (US, born 1929) French and English translation
August Wilhelm Hupel (Germany/Estonia, 1737–1819) Estonian general
Robert Hunter (Encyclopædist) (England, 1823–1897), lead editor of Encyclopædic Dictionary

I
Jonah ibn Janah (Spain, c. 990–1050) Hebrew lexicon
Ibn Manzur (Maghreb Arabia, 1233–1312) Arabic dictionary incorporating earlier
Laurynas Ivinskis (Lithuania, 1810–1881) Lithuanian bilingual

J
Jin Qizong (China, 1918–2004) Jurchen and Chinese bilingual
John Jamieson (UK, 1759–1838) Lowland Scots language etymological
Marcus Jastrow (Poland, 1829–1903) Talmudic language general
Jauhari (Iraq?, 10th century) Arabic language alphabetical 
Christian Gottlieb Jöcher (Germany, 1694–1758) German biographical
John of Genoa → Johannes Balbus
Samuel Johnson (UK, 1709–1784) English general, A Dictionary of the English Language
Alexander Keith Johnston (UK, 1804–1871) English LSP dictionary and atlas
Dafydd Glyn Jones (Wales, born 1941) English and Welsh bilingual
Eliza Grew Jones (US/Burma, 1803–1838) Siamese (Thai) and English bilingual
Henry Stuart Jones (UK, 1867–1939) Greek and English
Adoniram Judson (US/Myanmar, 1788–1850) Burmese and English bilingual
Joseph Jungmann (Czechoslovakia, 1773–1847) Czech and German bilingual
Daniel Juslenius (Finland, 1676–1752) Finnish general

K
Vuk Stefanović Karadžić (Serbia, 1787–1864) Serbian general
Mahmud al-Kashgari (Turkey, 1005–1102), Uyghur language
Bartol Kašić (Croatia, 1575–1650) Croatian and Italian bilingual
John Samuel Kenyon (US, 1874–1959) English pronunciation
Adam Kilgarriff (UK, 1960–2015) English and computer lexicography
Barbara Ann Kipfer (US, born 1954) English general and LSP
Ferdinand Kittel (Germany/India, 1832–1903) Kannada and English bilingual
Friedrich Kluge (Germany, 1856–1926) German language etymological
Grzegorz Knapski (Poland, 1561–1639) Polish, Latin and Greek thesaurus
Władysław Kopaliński (Poland, 1907–2007) Polish etymological
Emmanuel Kriaras (Greece, 1906–2014) Greek historical
Raphael Kuhner (Germany, 1802–1878) Greek and Latin
Hans Kurath (Austria/US, 1891–1992) English historical, dialect atlas

L
Sita Ram Lalas (India, 1908–1986) Rajasthani language historical
Wilfred G. Lambert (England, 1926–2011) Assyrian language
Edward William Lane (1801–1876) translation of medieval Arabic dictionaries to English
Pierre Larousse (France, 1817–1875) French general dictionary and encyclopedic
Donald Laycock (Australia, 1936–1988) languages of Papua New Guinea
James Legge (UK/China, 1815–1897) Chinese language
George William Lemon (UK, 1726–1797) English etymological
John Lemprière (Jersey, 1765–1824) dictionary of classical proper names
Charlton Thomas Lewis (1834–1904) Latin and English bilingual
Matthias von Lexer (Germany, 1830–1892) German historical
Li Fanwen (China, born 1932) Tangut and Chinese bilingual
Henry Liddell (UK, 1811–1898) Greek and English bilingual lexicon
Sven Lidman (Sweden, 1921–2011) Swedish encyclopedic
Lin Yutang (China/US, 1895–1976) Chinese and English bilingual
Samuel Linde (Poland, 1771–1847) Polish language general
Émile Littré (France, 1801–1881) French language general
Thomas Lloyd (Wales, 1673–1734) Welsh language
Elias Lönnrot (Finland, 1802–1884) Finnish and Swedish bilingual

M
Mackintosh MacKay (Scotland, 1793–1873) probable earliest dictionary of Scots Gaelic (1828)
Stepan Malkhasyants (Armenia, 1857–1947) Armenian language historical
Mouloud Mammeri (Algeria, 1917–1989) Tamazight lexicography
Francis Andrew March (US, 1825–1911) comparative linguistics, English historical
Francis Mason (UK/US/Burma, 1799–1874) Burmese
Percy C. Mather (UK/China, 1882–1933) Mongolian
Robert Henry Mathews (Australia/China, 1877–1970) Chinese and English bilingual
Johann Mattheson (Germany, 1681–1764) music, German
Tom McArthur (UK), Dictionary Research Centre, University of Exeter
Erin McKean (US, born 1971) English general and LSP
Lambert McKenna (Ireland, 1870–1956) English and Irish bilingual
Walter Henry Medhurst (UK/China, 1796–1857) Chinese and English bilingual
Igor Mel'čuk (Russia/Canada, born 1932) French
Gilles Ménage (France, 1613–1692) etymological dictionary of French
Francisci a Mesgnien Meninski (1623–1698) first large Turkish-to-Latin
Wilhelm Meyer-Lübke (Switzerland/Germany, 1861–1936) Romance languages
Minamoto no Shitagō (Japan, 911–983) Japanese thesaurus
William Chester Minor (Sri Lanka/USA/UK, 1834–1920) English historical
John Minsheu (England, 1560–1627) Spanish and English bilingual, 11-language multilingual dictionary
María Moliner (Spain, 1900–1981) Spanish general 
Judah Monis (US, 1683–1764) Hebrew language
Paul Monroe (US, 1869–1947) English encyclopedic
Morohashi Tetsuji (Japan, 1883–1982) Chinese and Japanese bilingual
Robert Morrison (UK/China, 1782–1834) Chinese and English bilingual
Mahshid Moshiri (Iran, born 1951) Persian language pronunciation and LSP dictionaries
Joseph Moxon (UK, 1627–1691) English LSP
Kārlis Mīlenbahs (Latvia, 1853–1916) Latvian and German bilingual
Wilhelm Max Müller (Germany/US, 1862–1919) Hebrew language
Monier Monier-Williams (India/UK, 1819–1899) Sanskrit English
Pamela Munro (US, born 1947) Native American language dictionaries
James Murray (UK, 1837–1915) English historical
Vladimir Müller (Russia, 1880 – before 1943) English–Russian

N
Hajime Nakamura (Japan, 1911–1999) Sanskrit and Pali languages
Nathan ben Jehiel (Italy, c. 1035–1106) Hebrew
William Allen Neilson (UK/US, 1869–1946) English general
Andrew Nelson (US/Japan, 1893–1975) Japanese and English bilingual
Jean Nicot (France, 1530–1600) French historical
Sandro Nielsen (Denmark, born 1961) Danish LSP 
Njattyela Sreedharan (India, born 1938) Dravidian languages
Nonius Marcellus (Italy, 3rd/4th centuries) Latin lexicon
Jerry Norman (US, 1936–2012) Manchu-English

O
Niall Ó Dónaill (Ireland, 1908–1995) Irish and English bilingual
John Ogilvie (UK, 1797–1867) English language general
Charles Talbut Onions (UK, 1873–1965) English language historical
Sulkhan-Saba Orbeliani (Georgia, 1658–1725) Georgian language general
Oros of Alexandria (Egypt?, 5th century) Ancient Greek language
Osbern of Gloucester (UK, 1123–1200) Latin language etymological
Ōtsuki Fumihiko (Japan, 1847–1928) Japanese language general
Sergei Ozhegov (Russia, 1900–1964) Russian language general

P
Condé Benoist Pallen (US, 1858–1929) English language encyclopedia
Alfredo Panzini (Italy, 1863–1939) Italian general
Eric Partridge (New Zealand/Australia/UK, 1894–1979) English slang
Franz Passow (Germany, 1786–1933) Greek language historical
Hermann Paul (Germany, 1846–1921) German language historical
Andrew Pawley (Australia/New Zealand, born 1941) Austronesian languages
Clemente Peani (Italy/India, 1731–1782) Malayalam language
Edmund Peck (Canada, 1850–1924) Inaktitut and English bilingual
Aaron Peckham (US) English language slang
Philitas of Cos (Greece, c. 340–285 BC) Ancient Greek glossary
Philo of Byblos (Greece, c. 64–141 AD) Ancient Greek dictionary of synonyms
Sreekanteswaram Padmanabha Pillai (India, 1864–1946) Malayalam dictionary
Iwo Cyprian Pogonowski (Poland, US, 1921–2016) Polish and English bilingual
Julius Pollux (Egypt/Greece, 2nd century) Ancient Greek thesaurus
Noah Porter (US, 1811–1892) English language general
Malachy Postlewayt (UK, c. 1707–1767) English language LSP

R
Ola Raknes (Norway/US, 1887–1975) Norwegian and English bilingual
Stanislovas Rapalionis (Lithuania/Germany, 1485–1545) Lithuanian language
Rasmus Christian Rask (Denmark, 1787–1832) Indo-European comparative linguistics
Allen Walker Read (US, 1906–2002) English language glossary
James Redhouse (UK, 1811–1892) Turkish and English bilingual
Gustaf Renvall (Finland, 1781–1841) Finnish language general
Alain Rey (France, 1928–2020) French language general and LSP
Barbara Reynolds (UK, 1914–2015) Italian language
Kel Richards (Australia, born 1946) English language dialect
César-Pierre Richelet (French, 1626–1698) French language general
John Rider (UK/Ireland, 1562–1632) Latin language etymological
William Rider (UK, 1723–1785) English language general
Mark Ridley (England, 1560 – c. 1624) Russian/English and English/Russian
Paul Robert (French, 1910–1980) French language general
Nancy Roper (UK, 1918–2004) Nursing and medical dictionaries
Joseph Francis Charles Rock (Austria/US/China, 1884–1962) Naxi and English bilingual
Peter Mark Roget (UK, 1779–1869) English thesaurus
Leo Rosten (Poland–Russia/US, 1908–1997) Hebrew and English lexicon

S
Rachel Saint (US/Ecuador/Africa, 1914–1994) Waorani dictionary
Jean-Baptiste de La Curne de Sainte-Palaye (France, 1697–1781) French glossary
William Salesbury (UK, c. 1520–1600) English and Welsh bilingual
Pekka Sammallahti (Finland, born 1947) Sámi dictionaries
Daniel Sanders (Germany, 1819–1897) German general
Francisco J. Santamaría (Mexico, 1886–1963) Spanish dictionary of Americanisms
Irene Saunders (US/China, living) Chinese and English bilingual
Valentin Schindler (Germany, died 1604) Hebrew et al. five-language
Steinar Schjøtt (Norway, 1844–1920) Norwegian and Danish bilingual
Johann Gottlob Schneider (Germany, 1750–1822) Ancient Greek and German bilingual
Ericus Schroderus (Sweden, 1608–1639) Latin and Scandinavian languages multilingual
August Schumann (Germany, 1773–1826) German language dictionary of Saxony
Norman W. Schur (US, 1907–1992) English lexicons
Robert Scott (UK, 1811–1887) Ancient Greek and English bilingual
Kurt Heinrich Sethe (Germany, 1869–1934) Ancient Egyptian language
Stephen Sewall (US, 1734–1804) Hebrew language
Sextus Pompeius Festus (Roman Empire, 2nd century) Ancient Latin etymological
Shan-ul-Haq Haqqee (Pakistan/Canada, 1917–2005) Urdu language
Jesse Sheidlower (US, born 1968) English language historical
Thomas A. Sherwood (US, 1791–1879) English place names gazetteer
David Shulman (US, 1912–2004) English language historical
Natalia Shvedova (Russia, 1916–2009) Russian language explanatory
John Simpson (UK, born 1953) English language historical
John McHardy Sinclair (UK, 1933–2007) English corpus linguistics, learners'
Konstantinas Sirvydas (Lithuania, 1580–1631) Lithuanian–Latin–Polish trilingual
Stephen Skinner (UK, 1623–1667) English etymological
Johan Kristian Skougaard (Norway, 1847–1925) Norwegian and French bilingual
Nicholas Slonimsky (Russia, 1894–1995) Musicology, biography and literary criticism
Benjamin Eli Smith (US, 1857–1913) English general and LSP
John Smith (US, died 1809) Hebrew
William Smith (UK, 1813–1893) Greek and Romance languages LSP
Knut Fredrik Söderwall (Sweden, 1842–1924) Old Swedish
William Edward Soothill (UK/China, 1861–1935) Chinese language LSP
Lewis Spence (UK, 1874–1955) English language LSP
Alexander Spiers (UK/France, 1807–1869) English and French bilingual
Izmail Sreznevsky (Russia, 1812–1880) Ancient Russian language historical
Kory Stamper (US, living) Modern American/English
Jan Stanisławski (Poland, 1893–1973) Polish and English bilingual
Joakim Stulić (Croatia, 1730–1817) Croatian–Latin–Italian trilingual
Nahum Stutchkoff (US, 1893–1965) Yiddish

T
John Van Nest Talmage (US/China, 1819–1892) Chinese and English bilingual
Peter Tamony (US, 1902–1985) English LSP etymology
Jack Thiessen (Canada, 1932–present) Plautdietsch
Antoine Thomas (Belgium, 1644–1709) mathematics glossary
Theodoor Gautier Thomas Pigeaud (Germany/Netherlands, 1899–1988) Javanese and Dutch
Lewis Thorpe (UK, died 1977) French language
Alf Torp (Norway, 1853–1916) Norwegian and Danish bilingual etymological

U
Martin Ulvestad (Norway/US, 1865–1942) English–Danish–Norwegian trilingual
Laurence Urdang (US, 1927–2008) English language general
Dmitry Ushakov (Russia, 1873–1942) Russian language general

V
Oreste Vaccari (Italy/Japan, died 1980) Japanese–English bilingual
Johan Hendrik van Dale (Netherlands, 1828–1872) creator of Van Dale's Great Dictionary of the Dutch Language
Louis Gustave Vapereau (France, 1819–1906) French LSP
G. Venkatasubbaiah (India, 1913–2021) Kannada language general dictionary, Kannada and English bilingual
Verrius Flaccus (Ancient Rome, c. 55 BC – 20 AD) Latin language orthographic
Faust Vrančić (Croatia, 1551–1617) Croatian et al. five-language

W
Magdi Wahba (Egypt, 1925–1991) Arabic and English bilingual
Noël François de Wailly (France, 1724–1801) French language neologisms
John Walker (UK, 1732–1807) English rhymes and pronunciation
Fr. Paul Walsh (Ireland, 1885–1941) Irish place names and genealogy
John Walters (Wales, 1721–1797) English and Welsh languages
Wang Li (China, 1900–1986) Chinese dictionary of word families
Grady Ward (US, born 1951) English thesaurus
Oliver Wardrop (UK, 1864–1948) Georgian language
Noah Webster (US, 1758–1843) English language general
Edmund Weiner (UK, born 1950) English language historical
William Dwight Whitney (US, 1827–1894) English language general dictionary, English and German bilingual
Harischandra Wijayatunga (Sri Lanka, born 1931) Sinhala language general
Samuel Wells Williams (US/China, 1812–1884) Chinese language dictionary, Cantonese language
Miron Winslow (US/Sri Lanka, 1789–1864) Tamil and English bilingual
Arok Wolvengrey (Canada, born 1965) Cree and English bilingual
Joseph Emerson Worcester (US, 1784–1865) English general and LSP dictionaries
Elizabeth Mary Wright (UK, 1863–1958) English dialect
Joseph Wright (UK, 1855–1930) English dialect
Henry Cecil Kennedy Wyld (UK, 1870–1945) English language general

X
Xu Shen (China, c. 58–147) Chinese character dictionary

Y
Robert W. Young (US, 1912–2007) Navajo language general
Henry Yule (Scotland and India, 1820–1889), co-compiler of Hobson-Jobson ("A Glossary of Colloquial Anglo-Indian Words and Phrases, and of Kindred Terms, Etymological, Historical, Geographical and Discursive")

Z
Ladislav Zgusta (Czechoslovakia/US, 1924–2007) historical/comparative linguistics, onomastics, lexicography
Ben Zimmer (US, born 1971) English language visual thesaurus
Ghil'ad Zuckermann (Australia/Israel/Italy/UK, born 1971) Barngarla, Hebrew lexicology, phono-semantic matching, expert witness in lexicography

See also
List of linguists

References

+
Lexicographers